Halleck may refer to:

People

Given name
 Halleck J. Mantz (1877–1958), jurist
 Halleck Tustenuggee (c. 1807–?), Seminole warchief

Surname
 Charles A. Halleck (1900–1986), American politician
 DeeDee Halleck (born 1940), American media activist
 Fitz-Greene Halleck (1790–1867), American poet
 Henry Halleck (1815–1872), American soldier, scholar, and lawyer
 Paul Halleck (1913–1974), American football player

Characters
 Billy Halleck, a character in the 1984 novel Thinner by Stephen King
 Gurney Halleck, a character in the Dune novels of Frank Herbert

Places
 Halleck, Missouri
 Halleck, Nevada
 Halleck, West Virginia

Other
 Halleck Formation, geologic formation in Alaska
 Halleck Range, mountain range in Alaska

See also
 Fort Halleck (disambiguation)
 Manhattan Community Access Corp. v. Halleck, court case
 
 Hallock (disambiguation)